Ibai Llanos Garatea (born 26 March 1995), better known mononymously as Ibai, is a Spanish internet celebrity, streamer, and esports caster. He was a content creator for G2 Esports from 2020 to 2021. He is co-owner of the esports team KOI.

On the livestreaming platform Twitch, Ibai operates the fourth most-followed channel in the world according to analytics company Social Blade. On YouTube, he has more than 9 million subscribers on his main channel and a total of 2 billion video views. In 2021, Forbes Spain named him the most influential social media influencer in Spain. Ahead of the 2022 League of Legends World Championship group stage, it was announced that Ibai's esports team KOI would merge with Rogue, which would see all of Rogue's existing teams rebrand to KOI.

Biography 
Ibai was born in the Deusto district of Bilbao, Spain on 26 March 1995. Due to the 2008 financial crisis and economic instability at home, he hid out on videogames.

In 2014, at the age of nineteen, he started his career in League of Legends professional competition. In August during Season 7 of Liga de Videojuegos Profesional, LVP, Honor Division he narrated his first League of Legends match between wSystem and PainGaming.

In 2016, he moved from Bilbao to Barcelona to be able to work as an announcer.

After broadcasting for the LVP, specifically for the Orange Super League, in February 2019 he started to present a late night show for the Ubeat network called "Hoy no se sale", currently presented by Bruno Feliu and Cristina López, also known as Kapo 013 and Cristinini respectively.

In February 2020, a year after starting this journey, he announced that he was leaving his work at the LVP to become an exclusive content creator for the G2 Esports team, with Ander Cortés, Reven & Ernesto BarbeQ Folch. As of now, he dedicates his entire time to creating content for Twitch.

In his time as an streamer he has carried out several mass events such as "La Liga Santander Challenge" or charity collaborations with La Liga Santander and Banco Santander that took place during the lockdown suffered in Spain in March 2020 due to the COVID-19 pandemic.

In January 2021, he announced his departure from G2 and formed his own streaming brand alongside the previously mentioned creators with the addition of Cristinini, Knekro, Werlyb and Illojuan. He founded the esports team Finetwork KOI alongside Gerard Piqué, with the headquarters in Barcelona. It competes with League of Legends, Valorant and Teamfight Tactics, and the team has JuanSGuarnizo, Ander Cortés, Knekro, Mayichi, and Axozer as his players.

On 5 February 2021, he started a new series on his channel called "Charlando tranquilamente" ("Calmly Chatting") dedicated to talking (between 30 minutes to 1 hour and a half) with public figures. In his first program, he spoke with footballer Gerard Piqué. Future shows featured footballers such as Andrés Iniesta, Ronaldinho, Paulo Dybala, Sergio Agüero and Sergio Ramos, and musical artists like Ed Sheeran, Nicky Jam, J Balvin, Rauw Alejandro, Jhayco, Duki, Aitana, Nicki Nicole.

On 21 August 2021, he shared a tweet showing a clip of two young people playing a balloon game; in which both, agile and fast, kept the balloon from falling to the ground until there was a winner. Ibai said he wanted to buy the rights to this game and organize a whole World Cup of that activity. On 26 September 2021, together with the Spanish footballer Gerard Piqué, they made official a world balloon tournament called Balloon World Cup, which took place on October 14 of that same year.

On June 25, 2022, Ibai, with more than 3.3 million viewers during the Velada del Año 2, surpassed the record of 2.4 million viewers TheGrefg obtained back on January 11, 2021, with his Fortnite outfit reveal.

Personal life
Ibai currently lives in Barcelona, in 2021 he separated from G2 and rented a streaming house in which he lives with his 8 friends and various streamers.

On 7 August 2021, in the midst of the uproar over the fate of Messi's career, the footballer made a farewell dinner in Barcelona and invited Ibai, who attended it together with Coscu and Sergio Agüero. Other celebrities who attended the dinner include Gerard Piqué, Shakira, Jordi Alba and many more.

Filmography

Television

Esports

Traditional sports

Documentaries

Films

Other

Awards and nominations

See also
List of most-followed Twitch channels

References

Living people
1995 births
Spanish YouTubers
People from Bilbao
Twitch (service) streamers